Jason Joel Jimenez Abalos (born January 14, 1985) is a Filipino actor, host, model, endorser and politician.

Acting career
Abalos is a former member of Star Magic talents until 2017. He was discovered after joining Star Circle Quest, a reality show in search of new actors. On August 7, 2008, he won Best Performance by Male or Female, Adult or Child, Individual or Ensemble in Leading or Supporting Role award in the Young Critics Circle Annual Citation held at the Faculty Center Conference (Pulungang Recto, Bulwagang Rizal) Hall of the University of the Philippines Diliman, Quezon City. The award was for his role in the indie film Adela,  directed by Adolfo Alix, Jr. and starring Anita Linda (in the 2008 Cinemalaya Independent Film Festival).

On October 1, 2008, he won the Best Actor in the 2008 Gawad Urian Awards for Endo.

He is a celebrity endorser of Aficionado Germany Perfume with his own product Jason EDT (Eau de Toilette). He was relaunched as endorser on January 8, 2011, during the grand "1@11" event at the SM Mall of Asia Concert Grounds attended by 85,000 people.

On October 3, 2017, Abalos transferred to GMA Network and signed an exclusive contract at GMA Artist Center after 13 years as a talent of Star Magic of ABS-CBN.

Political career
His father, Popoy Abalos, is a former board member of the Second District of Nueva Ecija.

In the 2016 elections, Abalos, ran under Liberal Party, but failed in his attempt to obtain a membership in the municipal council of Pantabangan, Nueva Ecija.

In the 2022 elections, ran under PDP–Laban to “pursue what [his] father had started”, he was elected board member of the province's Second District.

Personal life
In his early years, Abalos studied in his hometown, Pantabangan. He later obtained a bachelor's degree in civil engineering from the Nueva Ecija University of Science and Technology.

His engagement in 2021 with his long-time partner, actress and Binibining Pilipinas 2018 runner-up Vickie Rushton, was revealed in June 2022. They were married in a church wedding ceremony in Batangas on September 1 of the same year.

Filmography

Film

Television

References

External links
 Jason Abalos on Star Magic
 Jason Abalos on GMA Artist Center
 
 

1985 births
Living people
21st-century Filipino male actors
ABS-CBN personalities
GMA Network personalities
Filipino male comedians
Filipino male models
Filipino male television actors
Ilocano people
Male actors from Nueva Ecija
Star Circle Quest participants
Star Magic personalities
Filipino male film actors
Filipino actor-politicians